Emmanuel Aghogho Oluwafemi Dieseruvwe (born 20 February 1995) is an English professional footballer who plays as a forward for National League side FC Halifax Town.

Beginning his career with Sheffield Wednesday, Dieseruvwe has played for Chesterfield, Salford City and Tranmere Rovers with loan spells at Hyde, Fleetwood Town, Mansfield Town, Kidderminster Harriers, Boston United, Chester, Oldham Athletic and Grimsby Town.

Career

Sheffield Wednesday
Born in Leeds, England, Dieseruvwe started his career at Sheffield Wednesday. In 2013, having progressed through the Yorkshire club's youth academy, Dieseruvwe signed his first professional contract at the club.

After being told by Manager Dave Jones that he needed to be loaned out for first team football, Dieseruvwe was loaned to Hyde on a month-long youth loan deal.

After making seven appearances for Hyde, Dieseruvwe joined Fleetwood Town on a month-long youth loan deal. Dieseruvwe made his Football League debut for Fleetwood Town on 2 November 2013, as an 83rd-minute substitute in a 4–1 win over Newport County. Soon after, Dieseruvwe's loan spell at Fleetwood was extended until 2 February 2014. After making six appearances for Fleetwood Town, it was announced on 20 January 2014 that Dieseruvwe was to return to Sheffield Wednesday.

Chesterfield
After expressing his desire to be loaned out in determination of making a breakthrough at Sheffield Wednesday, Dieseruvwe joined Chesterfield on 3 January 2015 on a youth loan deal. Upon moving to Chesterfield, Dieseruvwe described the move as "a big chance" and "another step up". On 17 January 2015, Dieseruvwe made his Chesterfield debut, in a 3–1 loss against Swindon Town. Soon after, Dieseruvwe told of being settled at Chesterfield.

On 2 February 2015, Dieseruvwe made his loan move permanent by signing an 18-month contract. Dieseruvwe's first game after signing for the club on a permanent basis came on 7 February 2015, coming on as a substitute for Armand Gnanduillet, in a 1–0 win over Notts County. On 11 August 2015, Dieseruvwe scored his first goal for Chesterfield, the equaliser in an eventual 3–1 defeat to Carlisle United, though he was later sent off in extra-time.

Kidderminster Harriers
He then joined National League North team Kidderminster Harriers, signing a one-year contract, with manager John Eustace saying the club was "excited" with Dieseruvwe's signing. He moved on loan to Boston United in March 2017, making his début against Worcester City. He was released by Kidderminster in May upon the expiration of his contract.

Salford City
He then signed in May 2017 for Salford City. On 11 May 2019, Dieseruvwe opened the scoring in the 2019 National League play-off Final, with Salford going on to win the game against AFC Fylde 3–0 and reach the English Football League for the first time in the club's history. On 3 August, Dieseruvwe scored Salford's first ever Football League goal, which came in the first match of the 2019–20 season against Stevenage. He went on to score a second goal that day as the 'Ammies' recorded a 2–0 victory. On 8 December 2020, he came on as a substitute and scored two goals in the EFL Trophy second round fixture against Leicester City U21's, a game which went to a penalty shoot-out after a 3–3 draw; Dieseruvwe missed Salford's first penalty and ultimately exited the competition 6–5 in the shootout.

Loans and departure
On 26 October 2018, he joined National League North side Chester on loan for one month. At the end of the 2018–19 season he extended his contract with Salford, signing a new two-year contract. Dieseruvwe joined Oldham Athletic on loan on 10 January 2020 for the rest of the 2019–20 season.

At the end of the 2020–21 season, it was announced that he would be leaving the club.

Tranmere Rovers 
On 28 June 2021, Dieseruvwe signed for fellow League 2 side Tranmere Rovers on a one-year deal.

Before his loan spell had even ended, on 10 May 2022 Dieseruwve didn't make Tranmere's retained list for the 2022–23 season, with the club announcing he was to be released at the end of his contract.

Loan to Grimsby Town 
On 18 February 2022, Dieseruvwe joined National League side Grimsby Town on loan for the remainder of the 2021–22 season.

On the final day of the 2021–22 season, Dieseruwve scored a hat-rick for Grimsby in a 4-4 draw away at Eastleigh that saw The Mariners progress into the National League play-offs. On 23 May, he scored the winning goal in extra time as Grimsby knocked Notts County out of the play-offs at Meadow Lane. He scored again in the play-off semi-final in a 5-4 away victory over Wrexham to progress into the play-off final at the London Stadium.

Dieseruvwe played in the 2022 National League play-off Final as Grimsby beat Solihull Moors 2–1 at the London Stadium to return to the Football League.

FC Halifax Town
On 1 July 2022, Dieseruvwe signed for FC Halifax Town ahead of the 2022–23 season following his release by Tranmere. He scored his first two goals for The Shaymen in a 2–0 home win against Gateshead on 13 September.

Career statistics

Honours
Salford City

National League North 2017–18
National League play-offs: 2019
EFL Trophy: 2019–20

Grimsby Town
National League play-off winners: 2022

References

External links

1994 births
Living people
Footballers from Leeds
English footballers
Association football forwards
Sheffield Wednesday F.C. players
Hyde United F.C. players
Fleetwood Town F.C. players
Chesterfield F.C. players
Mansfield Town F.C. players
Kidderminster Harriers F.C. players
Boston United F.C. players
Salford City F.C. players
Chester F.C. players
Oldham Athletic A.F.C. players
Tranmere Rovers F.C. players
Grimsby Town F.C. players
FC Halifax Town players
National League (English football) players
English Football League players
Black British sportspeople